Drains Bay (possibly  + English "bay") is a small residential and commuter settlement about  north of Larne and south of Ballygalley on the coast of County Antrim, Northern Ireland.

The village is mainly residential with many retired people living there. Some residents commute to Larne by car and to Belfast by car or by train (from Larne). There is a nearby beach with benches, public toilets, picnic tables and a play area for children. On the other side of the settlement are hills popular with walkers, hikers and also landscape painters. There are no shops in Drains Bay, but it is visited by mobile shops at weekends.

To the north of Drains Bay lies Carnfunnock Country Park.

References

Villages in County Antrim